Sierra La Mojonera Flora and Fauna Protection Area is a protected natural area of northeastern Mexico. It covers a portion of the Sierra La Mojonera range, a western outlier of the Sierra Madre Oriental, in northern San Luis Potosí. The protected area was established in 2000, and covers an area of 92.02 km2.

Flora and fauna
According to the National Biodiversity Information System of Comisión Nacional para el Conocimiento y Uso de la Biodiversidad (CONABIO) in Sierra La Mojonera Flora and Fauna Protection Area there are over 30 plant and animal species from which 1 are exotic.

References

Flora and fauna protection areas of Mexico
Protected areas of San Luis Potosí
Protected areas of the Sierra Madre Oriental